Novokazatskoye is a rural locality (a selo) in Valuysky District, Belgorod Oblast, Russia. The population was 371 as of 2010. There are 4 streets.

Geography 
Novokazatskoye is located 4 km east of Valuyki (the district's administrative centre) by road. Luchka is the nearest rural locality.

References 

Rural localities in Valuysky District